NEWSru.com was a Russian online news site, based in Moscow, which had a government-critical orientation.

History

NEWSru.com was originally launched in 2000 at the address ntv.ru. When the government took over the NTV network in 2000, with the network becoming part of OAO Gazprom Media, the site remained part of the media empire of former NTV owner, oligarch Vladimir Gusinsky.

Yelena Bereznitskaya-Bruni replaced the initial Editor in Chief Igor Barchugov in 2001.

In October 2002 the news site moved to another domain name, NEWSru.com and the original domain ntv.ru was transferred to the broadcasting company by mutual agreement.

On May 31, 2021, the site announced it would discontinue its news reporting "for economic reasons, but ones caused specifically by the political situation in our country", but that the "entire archive accumulated over 21 years of work" would remain available.

The Israeli branch newsru.co.il remains in operation.

As of 2021, most of the former Russian site is now under a Creative Commons "Attribution" license.

Headquarters and team 
NEWSru was based in Moscow, but its editorial team and location were kept secret. The network had two foreign editions: a website in Israel started in December 2005 (newsru.co.il), and a Ukrainian edition based in Kiev, which was discontinued in March 2017.

Chief editor Olga Leni admitted that the Ukrainian publication had been subsidized for the entire 10 years of its existence, and the site had never been self-supporting. Other former employees agreed that the site was closed due to a pro-Ukrainian pronouncement on the conflict in Donbas.

Projects
In addition to the basic site, the NEWSru service owned a number of special interest news sites.

Among its defunct projects was 2004.newsru.com, devoted in real time to the 2004 Russian presidential election.

References

External links
 
 NEWSru.com (now only archive) 
 NEWSru.co.il 

News agencies based in Russia
Russian news websites
Ukrainian news websites
Internet properties established in 2000
Israeli news websites
Internet properties disestablished in 2021
Vladimir Gusinsky